Richard Ivanovich Kosolapov (25 March 1930 – 15 November 2020) was a Soviet and Russian scientist, author, social philosopher, doctor of philosophy and journalist. He was a professor at the Moscow State University (MSU).

Biography
Kosolapov was born in Novonikolayevsky, Volgograd Oblast. He graduated from the Moscow State University Faculty of Philosophy in 1955. He later went there to graduate school, receiving his Candidate of Sciences in Philosophical Sciences in 1962, and subsequently returned to earn a Doktor Nauk in Philosophical Sciences in 1971. He also taught on the Faculty of Philosophy from 1961 to 1964. In 1974, he received the title of professor.

He was employed by the propaganda department of the Central Committee of the Communist Party of the Soviet Union from 1966 to 1974, rising to become its deputy head. Starting in 1974, he became the First Deputy Chief Editor of Pravda, and in 1976 became the Editor-in-Chief of the Kommunist, a post which he held until 1986. During his tenure at Kommunist, he was twice elected to the Central Committee of the CPSU, in 1976 and 1981. 

Returning to MSU in 1986, Kosolapov served as the acting Dean of the Faculty of Philosophy until 1987, after which he became a Professor of the Department of Historical Materialism until 1991, when he was named Senior Researcher in the Department of Social Philosophy and Philosophy of History, a position he held until 2015.

Kosolapov received a number of awards from the Soviet Union, including the Order of the Red Banner of Labour in 1971, the Order of the October Revolution in 1980, and the Order of Lenin, its highest civilian award, in 1984.

Kosolapov died on 15 November 2020, at the age of 90.

References

Online works in English
 Communism and Freedom (1970)
 Problems of Socialist Theory (1974)
 Socialism: Questions of Theory (1979)
 Developed Socialism: Theory and Practice (1983, as head of a team of authors)

1930 births
2020 deaths
People from Novonikolayevsky District
Professors of the Moscow State University
Central Committee of the Communist Party of the Soviet Union members
Tenth convocation members of the Soviet of the Union
Eleventh convocation members of the Soviet of the Union
Recipients of the Order of Lenin
Recipients of the Order of the Red Banner of Labour
Marxist journalists
Neo-Stalinists
Social philosophers
Russian communists
Russian Marxists
Russian philosophers
Soviet philosophers